Entandrophragma is a genus of eleven known species of deciduous trees in the family Meliaceae.

Description
Entandrophragma is restricted to tropical Africa. 
At least some of the species attain large sizes, reaching 40–50 m tall, exceptionally 60 m, and 2 m in trunk diameter.

It is dioecious, with male and female flowers on separate plants. The leaves are pinnate, with 5-9 pairs of leaflets, each leaflet 8–10 cm long with an acuminate tip. The flowers are produced in loose inflorescences, each flower small, with five yellowish petals about 2 mm long, and ten stamens. The fruit is a five-valved capsule containing numerous winged seeds.

Species
Accepted 11 Species:
 Entandrophragma angolense  (Welw.) Panshin 	
 Entandrophragma bussei  Harms ex Engl. 
 Entandrophragma candollei  Harms 	
 Entandrophragma caudatum  (Sprague) Sprague 
 Entandrophragma congoense  (Pierre ex De Wild.) A.Chev. 
 Entandrophragma cylindricum (Sprague) Sprague 
 Entandrophragma delevoyi  De Wild. 
 Entandrophragma excelsum  (Dawe & Sprague) Sprague 
 Entandrophragma palustre  Staner 
 Entandrophragma spicatum  (C.DC.) Sprague 
 Entandrophragma utile  (Dawe & Sprague) Sprague

Uses
The timber of a few species is traded as a tropical hardwood. It is sometimes termed under the generic label of mahogany, and while Entandrophragma is part of the family Meliaceae, it is not classified as genuine mahogany. The species shares many of the characteristics of genuine mahogany and is used as an alternative, with Sapele and Utile in particular bearing a close resemblance.

References

External links

Tiama Entandrophragma angolense
Wood properties
Wood anatomy

Kosipo Entandrophragma candollei
Wood properties
Wood anatomy

Sapeli Entandrophragma cylindricum
Wood properties
Wood anatomy

Sipo (Utile) Entandrophragma utile
Wood anatomy

 
Flora of Africa
Meliaceae genera
Dioecious plants